Bezirk Feldkirchen is a district of the state of Carinthia in Austria.

Municipalities

Towns (Städte) are indicated in boldface; suburbs, hamlets and other subdivisions of a municipality are indicated in small characters.

 Albeck (Slov.: Št. Rupert) (2)
 Albeck Obere Schattseite, Albeck Untere Schattseite, Benesirnitz, Egarn, Frankenberg, Grillenberg, Hochrindl, Hochrindl-Alpl, Hochrindl-Kegel, Hochrindl-Tatermann, Hofern, Holzern, Kalsberg, Kogl, Kruckenalm, Lamm, Leßnitz, Neualbeck, Oberdörfl, Obereggen, Seebachern, Sirnitz, Sirnitz-Schattseite, Sirnitz-Sonnseite, Sirnitz-Winkl, Spitzwiesen, St. Ruprecht, Stron, Unterdörfl, Untereggen, Weitental, Wippa
 Feldkirchen in Kärnten (Slov.: Trg)  (1)
 Glanegg (Slov.: Klanec)  (3)
 Bach, Besendorf, Deblach, Flatschach, Friedlach, Glanegg, Glantscha, Gösselsberg, Gramilach, Grintschach, Haidach, Kadöll, Krobathen, Kulm, Maria Feicht, Maria Feicht-Gegend, Mauer, Mautbrücken, Meschkowitz, Metschach, Paindorf, Rottendorf, Schwambach, St. Gandolf, St. Leonhard, Tauchendorf, Unterglanegg
 Gnesau (Slov.: Knežova) (4)
 Bergl, Eben, Gnesau, Görzberg, Görzwinkl, Gurk, Haidenbach, Maitratten, Mitteregg, Sonnleiten, Weißenbach, Zedlitzdorf
 Himmelberg (Slov.: Sokovo) (5)
 Außerteuchen, Dragelsberg, Draschen, Eden, Flatschach, Fresen, Glanz, Grilzberg, Grilzgraben, Grintschach, Himmelberg, Hochegg, Kaidern, Klatzenberg, Kösting, Kraß, Lassen, Linz, Manessen, Oberboden, Pichlern, Pojedl, Sallach, Saurachberg, Schleichenfeld, Schwaig, Sonnleiten, Spitzenbichl, Tiebel, Tiffnerwinkl, Tobitsch, Tschriet, Werschling, Winklern, Wöllach, Zedlitzberg
 Ossiach (Slov.: Osoje) (6)
 Alt-Ossiach, Ossiach, Ostriach, Rappitsch, Tauern, Untertauern
 Reichenau (Slov.: Rajnava) (7)
 Ebene Reichenau, Falkertsee, Falkertsee, Hinterkoflach, Lassen, Lorenzenberg, Mitterdorf, Patergassen, Plaß, Rottenstein, Saureggen, Schuß, Seebach, St. Lorenzen, St. Margarethen, Turracherhöhe, Vorderkoflach, Vorwald, Waidach, Wiederschwing, Wiedweg, Winkl
 Sankt Urban (Slov.: Št. Urban) (8)
 Agsdorf, Agsdorf-Gegend, Bach, Bach-St. Urban, Eggen, Gall, Gasmai, Göschl, Gößeberg, Grai, Hafenberg, Kleingradenegg, Lawesen, Oberdorf, Reggen, Retschitz, Retschitz-Simonhöhe, Rittolach, Rogg, St. Paul, St. Urban, Stattenberg, Trenk, Tumpf, Zirkitz, Zwattendorf
 Steindorf am Ossiacher See (Slov.: Kamna vas) (9)
 Apetig, Bichl, Bodensdorf, Burg, Burgrad, Golk, Langacker, Nadling, Ossiachberg, Pfaffendorf, Regin, Sonnberg, St. Urban, Steindorf am Ossiacher See, Stiegl, Stiegl, Tiffen, Tratten, Tscherneitsch, Tschöran, Unterberg, Winkl Ossiachberg
 Steuerberg (Slov.: Šterska Gora) (10)
 Dölnitz, Eden, Edern, Edling, Felfern, Fuchsgruben, Glabegg, Goggau, Graben, Hart, Hinterwachsenberg, Jeinitz, Kerschdorf, Köttern, Kraßnitz, Niederwinklern, Pölling, Prapra, Regenfeld, Rennweg, Rotapfel, Sallas, Sassl, Severgraben, St. Martin, Steuerberg, Thörl, Unterhof, Wabl, Wachsenberg, Wiggis

 
Districts of Carinthia (state)